Xavière Gauthier, pseudonym of Mireille Boulaire, born 20 October 1942 Toulon, is a French writer, journalist, publisher and academic. She is a French feminist.

Biography 
Mireille Boulaire was born in Toulon in 1942. She studied at the University of Caen Normandy. She was an educator of delinquent boys in a medico-pedagogical institute, in Vernon, then resumed studies in psychology, sociology, philosophy and aesthetics at the Sorbonne University.

She was a lecturer at the Paris 1 Panthéon-Sorbonne University. Her doctoral thesis was published in 1971 under the title Surréalisme et sexualité.

She devoted a large part of her work to the fight of women in the fight for abortion. She was an anti-nuclear activist.

She founded the review Sorcières, Les femmes vivants, an artistic and literary review of women's struggles, active from 1975 to 1982.

She was also a journalist at Bayard presse, at J'aime lire then at Je bouquine. She was an editor at Seuil for children's books, fiction and essays.

She transcribed in Les Parleuses (1974) her interviews with Marguerite Duras, fascinated by a truth that would emanate from the disorder and gaps in discourse6.

She specialized of Louise Michel, founder and director of the collection “Œuvres de Louise Michel”8, she wrote her biography, La Vierge rouge, and edited her correspondence.

She lectured at the Bordeaux Montaigne University, at the IUT Michel de Montaigne, in the publishing sector, where she teaches bibliology. She is a research fellow at the CNRS in literature, and ideologies, of the 18th–19th century.

Works 
 Surréalisme et sexualité (1971)
 Dire nos sexualités: contre la sexologie (1976);
 Les Parleuses (1974)  interviews with Marguerite Duras,
 Woman to woman,, Translator Katharine A. Jensen, Lincoln : University of Nebraska Press, 1987.

Works in English 
 Parisiennes : a celebration of French women, Paris : Flammarion, 2007. 
 Women of consequence : heroines who shaped the world, Paris : Flammarion, 2010.

References 

1942 births
Living people
Writers from Toulon
20th-century French women writers
University of Caen Normandy alumni
Paris-Sorbonne University alumni
French anti–nuclear activists
20th-century French journalists
Academic staff of Bordeaux Montaigne University
French bibliographers